A Chinese Ghost Story II is a 1990 Hong Kong romantic comedy-horror film directed by Ching Siu-tung and produced by Tsui Hark. It is the sequel to A Chinese Ghost Story and is followed by A Chinese Ghost Story III.

Plot
Following the events of the first film, Ning (Leslie Cheung) parts ways with the Taoist Yin (Wu Ma) and returns to his home village, which has since fallen on desperate times. Fleeing from cannibals, Ning winds up being imprisoned. Sharing a cell with Elder Chu, a renowned scholar, Ning spends apparent months languishing in prison. On the day of Ning's execution, the scholar reveals that he has dug out an escape tunnel. He gives Ning one of his books and a pendant, and sends Ning through the tunnel.

Ning obliviously steals the horse of Autumn (Jacky Cheung), a Taoist sectarian. When Ning stops for the night in an abandoned villa, Autumn catches up and the two sort out the misunderstanding. But in the middle of the night, rebel soldiers attack the two visitors. After a short skirmish, the rebel sisters Windy (Joey Wong) and Moon (Michelle Reis) discover Elder Chu's pendant. While Ning mistakes Windy for his love Siu Sin, whom she resembles, the rebels mistake Ning for the Elder Chu.

The sisters explain that their father, Lord Fu (Lau Siu-Ming), was framed for a crime and is now being transported to the place of his execution. The rebels' mission is to free him. They set off and leave Ning and Autumn at the villa. The next night, the two discover that the villa actually is haunted by a demon. Autumn manages to injure it, but it flees. He gives pursuit, but without success. He emerges at daybreak on a dirt road, causing an altercation with an imperial convoy led by Hu (Waise Lee). Hu and Autumn battle to a stalemate, and then go their separate ways. Unbeknownst to Autumn, the convoy is the one carrying the sisters' father.

Having failed to catch the convoy earlier, the rebels return to the haunted villa, waiting to ambush the convoy there. As the convoy enters, however, the demon returns as well. Maneuvering Hu into fighting the demon, the rebels are able to rescue the sisters' father. Before long, however, the Imperial High Monk arrives with his entourage. He incapacitates the rebels with a spell, which Autumn recognizes as an evil chant. Ning and Windy escape to seek the help of Yin, while Lord Fu, Autumn and Moon are captured by the monk.

The captives are brought back to the High Monk's palace. Now suspicious, Hu enters the palace only to find the hollow corpses of the entire royal court inside. Recognizing that the monk is in reality a demon, Hu frees the captives and fights valiantly by himself to allow them time to recover. Lacking spiritual magic, however, Hu is not able to overcome the demon and is destroyed. Just then, Yin and the others arrive. The demon is forced to reveal its true form, a gigantic thousand-year-old centipede. Yin and Autumn are swallowed by the creature, and they separate their souls from their bodies in order to destroy it from the inside. Autumn, however, is not able to return to his body, and his soul floats away.

The next day is the marriage of Windy to the Ma family. Ning runs down from his inn to the main street and tells Moon that he wishes Windy a long, happy marriage before leaving. In the desert, as Yin and Ning are about to continue their journey, they see two women approach on horseback, which happen to be Windy and Moon. Windy has escaped from her wedding and decides to leave with Ning.

Cast and roles
 Leslie Cheung - Ning Choi San
 Joey Wong - Ching Fung / Windy
 Michelle Reis - Yuet Chi / Moon
 Jacky Cheung - Chi Chau / Autumn
 Wu Ma - Yin Chek Hsia / Swordsman
 Ku Feng - Elder Chu
 Lau Shun - High priest
 Lau Siu-Ming - Lord Fu
 Waise Lee - Hu
 To Siu-Chun
 Yeung Jing-Jing
 Lee Fai
 Lau Siu-Hung
 Johnny Koo

Controversy in China
In 2019, the theme song of A Chinese Ghost Story II, or translated as "A Human's Path" was pulled from Apple Music in China due to its association with the Tiananmen Square Massacre.

The song was pulled from the streaming service after users of Weibo pointed out that the lyrics were a veiled reference to the bloody 1989 incident, which saw the Chinese military violently disperse unarmed pro-democracy student protesters who were occupying the famous square, killing hundreds.

References

External links

 
 
 
 https://coconuts.co/hongkong/news/1990-jacky-cheung-song-pulled-from-apple-music-in-china-because-of-link-to-tiananmen-square-massacre/

1990 films
1990 comedy films
1990s comedy horror films
1990 fantasy films
A Chinese Ghost Story films
Films directed by Ching Siu-tung
Hong Kong horror films
Hong Kong romantic comedy films
Hong Kong sequel films
Hong Kong New Wave films
1990s Hong Kong films